Bickleigh may refer to the following places in Devon, England:

 Bickleigh, Mid Devon, a village near Tiverton
 Bickleigh Castle
 Bickleigh, South Hams, a village near Plymouth